In the 1999 Dhivehi League, Club Valencia won the championship.

References
RSSSF

Dhivehi League seasons
Maldives
Maldives
football